Rozen Maiden is an anime series adapted from the manga of the same title by Peach-Pit. Produced by Nomad and directed by Kou Matsuo, the first season ran from 7 October 2004 to 23 December 2004. The second season appeared a year later; it was subtitled , and ran from 20 October 2005 to 5 January 2006. In 2006, a two-episode special titled  was aired on December 22 and 23, further expanding on the background of the characters.

In early 2007, Geneon USA announced it had licensed Rozen Maiden, and completely released the first season in three DVDs. Each DVD contained four episodes, and were subtitled Doll House, Maiden War, and War of the Rose, respectively. For Träumend, the first DVD, Puppet Show, was released on October 23, 2007. The other two DVDs, Revival and The Alice Game, were supposed to come out in December of that year, but were delayed because of the announcement that Geneon USA had decided to cancel its North American releases starting September 2007. On July 3, 2008, Geneon and Funimation Entertainment announced an agreement to distribute select titles in North America. While Geneon retained the license, Funimation assumed exclusive rights to the manufacturing, marketing, sales and distribution of select titles, including Rozen Maiden and Rozen Maiden: Träumend. Volume 2 of Träumend was officially released in North America on October 28, 2008, with the third volume following on December 9. The Rozen Maiden Träumend box set, containing the whole second season was released on July 21, 2009. In 2011, the North American anime licensor Sentai Filmworks re-licensed both seasons of Rozen Maiden, as well as the special Ouvertüre. A complete DVD set containing all three and a separate DVD release for the OVA were released on December 6, 2011.

Tokyopop Germany has completely released the first season on DVD, and the first Träumend DVD has originally been announced for March 2008, however the company, citing an increase in illegal downloads and a decrease in DVD sales, has announced that it will "pause" DVD sales. Kazé, an anime publisher in France, has licensed the anime and has completely released the two TV seasons and the special.

A third season titled Rozen Maiden Zurückspulen was produced by Studio Deen and directed by Mamoru Hatakeyama. It aired from July 4 to September 26, 2013 in Japan. The series was streamed on Crunchyroll. Sentai Filmworks has acquired Zurückspulen for streaming and home video release in 2014.

Episodes

Rozen Maiden

Rozen Maiden Träumend

Rozen Maiden Ouvertüre

Rozen Maiden Zurückspulen

References

Rozen Maiden
Episodes